Legendary Couple, also known as Story of a Robber, is a 1995 Hong Kong action film directed by Peter Ngor and starring Simon Yam and Chingmy Yau.

Plot
Ko Tin-lap (Simon Yam) is an honest and dutiful accountant. One day, his superior, Lui Chan-sam (Wan Yeung-ming) gives him the duty to escort HK$5 million to the bank. Ko encounters robbers on his way and the entire sum of money is stolen. Lui and the police believe the theft was planned by Ko in order to take the money for himself. Because of this, Ko not only loses his job, but his entire savings which are claimed by Lui.

Angry at his boss, Ko kidnaps Lui's daughter, Chi-lan (Chingmy Yau), and demands a ransom of HK$10 million. On the way to the ransom exchange, an accident happens and by chance, Ko saves Chi-lan. Afterwards, Chi-lan learns about the truth of Ko's misfortune and sympathizes with him. Later, a series of events leads Chi-lan to discover her father's greed and cold-bloodedness. Disappointed at her father, Chi-lan and Ko become a pair of vigilantes and battle against evil forces.

Cast and roles
 Simon Yam as Ko Tin-lap
 Chingmy Yau as Lui Chi-lan
 Wan Yeung-ming as Lui Chan-sam, father of Lui Chi-lan
 Gregory Charles Rivers as Officer John
 Kingdom Yuen as Tin-lap's wife
 Ng Yip-kwong as Lui Yau-choi
 Tam Suk-mui as Wai-ling
 Stuart Ong as Lam Tak-sing
 Wong Lai-mui as Wong Lai-mui
 Chan Chi-fai as Gangster injured by saw
 Nam Yin as Wai
 Frankie Ng as Wing
 Jack Wong as Wing's fellow
 Tanigaki Kenji as Wing's fellow
 Raven Choi as Man who robs Yau-choi
 Yiu Man-kei as Yau-choi's bodyguard
 So Wai-nam as Yau-choi's bodyguard
 Kong Foo-keung as Policeman
 Terrence Fok as Protesting tenant
 Tong Wai-hung
 William Leung as Parking warden
 Tony Chow as Man robbed by Tin-lap on yacht
 Leung Kwok-wai
 Kai Cheung-lung as Wai's dining associate
 Simon Cheung as Policeman
 Cheuk Man as Policeman
 Hon Ping as Policeman
 Woo Wing-tat
 Kwan Yung
 Mak Wai-cheung

External links
 IMDb entry
 HK cinemagic entry
 LoveHKfilm entry
 HKMDB entry

1995 films
1995 action films
Hong Kong action films
Gun fu films
Hong Kong vigilante films
1990s Cantonese-language films
Films set in Hong Kong
Films shot in Hong Kong
1990s Hong Kong films